Princess Marie of Schwarzburg-Rudolstadt (29 January 1850 – 22 April 1922) was the consort and third wife of Frederick Francis II, Grand Duke of Mecklenburg-Schwerin. She was mother of Prince Hendrik, consort of Queen Wilhelmina of the Netherlands and father of Queen Juliana.

Early life
Princess Marie of Schwarzburg-Rudolstadt, the first child of Prince Adolph of Schwarzburg-Rudolstadt (1801-1875) and his wife, Princess Mathilde of Schönburg-Waldenburg (1826-1914), was born at Raben Steinfeld, Mecklenburg-Schwerin. Her paternal great-grandfathers were Frederick Charles, Prince of Schwarzburg-Rudolstadt and Frederick V, Landgrave of Hesse-Homburg.

Her family belonged to the Principality of Schwarzburg-Rudolstadt. Her brother was Günther Victor, Prince of Schwarzburg.

Marriage
On 4 July 1868 in Rudolstadt, Schwarzburg-Rudolstadt, Marie married Frederick Francis II, Grand Duke of Mecklenburg-Schwerin, son of Paul Frederick, Grand Duke of Mecklenburg-Schwerin. Previously, Frederick Francis had been married twice: In 1849, he married Princess Augusta Reuss of Köstritz but she died in 1862. Two years later, Frederick Francis married secondly to Princess Anna of Hesse and by Rhine but less than a year after their marriage, Anna also died. At the time of the marriage, Frederick Francis was 45 and Marie 18. Together they had four children:

Duchess Elisabeth Alexandrine of Mecklenburg-Schwerin (10 August 1869 – 3 September 1955) she married Frederick Augustus II, Grand Duke of Oldenburg on 24 October 1896. They had five children.
Duke Friedrich Willhelm of Mecklenburg (5 April 1871 – 22 September 1897)
Duke Adolf Friedrich of Mecklenburg (10 October 1873 – 5 August 1969) he married Princess Viktoria Feodora of Reuss-Schleiz on 24 April 1917. They had one daughter, Woizlawa Feodora. He remarried Princess Elisabeth of Stolberg-Rossla on 15 October 1924. 
Duke Henry of Mecklenburg-Schwerin (19 April 1876 – 3 July 1934) he married Queen Wilhelmina of the Netherlands on 7 February 1901. They had one surviving child, Queen Juliana of the Netherlands. He is great-grandfather of the presents King of the Netherlands and Duke of Parna.

Death
Marie died in 1922 in The Hague. She was in The Hague to congratulate Prince Henry on his 46th birthday. The royal hearse brought the body from Noordeinde Palace to the railway station. The coffin then went by train to Germany, where the princess was buried.

Ancestry

References

thePeerage.com Marie Prinzessin von Schwarzburg-Rudolstadt

|-

1850 births
1922 deaths
People from Ludwigslust-Parchim
Princesses of Schwarzburg
Grand Duchesses of Mecklenburg-Schwerin
Duchesses of Mecklenburg-Schwerin
Burials at Schwerin Cathedral